Taranaki (often known as the Taranaki Bulls) are a New Zealand professional rugby union team based in New Plymouth, New Zealand. The union was originally established in 1889, with the National Provincial Championship established in 1976. They now play in the reformed National Provincial Championship competition. They play their home games at TET Stadium & Events Centre in Inglewood and Yarrow Stadium in the Taranaki region. The team is affiliated with the Chiefs Super Rugby franchise. Their home playing colours are yellow and black.

Current squad 

The Taranaki Bulls squad for the 2022 Bunnings NPC is:

Honours

Taranaki have been overall Champions once, winning the title in 2014. Their full list of honours include:

National Provincial Championship Second Division North Island
Winners: 1976, 1982, 1983, 1984

National Provincial Championship Second Division
Winners: 1985, 1992, 1995

ITM Cup Premiership Division
Winners: 2014

Bunnings NPC Championship Division
Winners: 2021

Current Super Rugby players 
Players named in the 2022 Taranaki Bulls squad, who also earned contracts or were named in a squad for any side participating in the 2022 Super Rugby Pacific season.

References

External links
 Official Site

National Provincial Championship
New Zealand rugby union teams
Sport in Taranaki